The 1980 South American Artistic Gymnastics Championships were held in Santiago, Chile, December 1980. It was the fifth edition of the South American Artistic Gymnastics Championships.

Participating nations

Medalists

References

1980 in gymnastics
South American Gymnastics Championships
International gymnastics competitions hosted by Chile
1980 in Chilean sport
December 1980 sports events in South America